Renown was a barque used as a sailing cargo ship built in 1842 by R. & H. Green in Blackwall, London. She survived a cyclone at Calcutta in 1864, and was sold to German owners in 1882. In 1887 or 1888 she foundered off Den Helder on the Dutch coast.

The storm and sinking
In December 1887, the Renown sank during a storm in the North Sea off Den Helder in the Netherlands. The survivors climbed up the mizzen-mast and were eventually rescued by a small lifeboat that approached the sinking ship. The lifeboat, captained by Dorus Rijkers, approached Renown, and Rijkers jumped out of the boat and climbed the mast. He and his crew helped the endangered men from the mast to the lifeboat, and brought them to dry land. Of the ship's total crew of 30, approximately five died in the shipwreck and the remainder were rescued between 9 and 11 December.

Aftermath

The heroic rescue ended successfully, and Dorus Rijkers was later awarded with a gold medal for valour. All of the surviving crew members received a small stipend from the court of The Hague after it was decided that they earned it because Renown was in bad condition when she left the harbor at Hamburg, Germany, one week before the accident.

See also
 Royal Netherlands Sea Rescue Institution

References

Barques
Individual sailing vessels
1842 ships
Ships built by the Blackwall Yard
Merchant ships of Germany
Maritime incidents in December 1887
Shipwrecks in the North Sea
Sea rescue